Brian John McCord (born 24 August 1968) is an English former professional footballer who played in the Football League for Barnsley, Derby County, Mansfield Town and Stockport County. McCord was awarded £250,000 by the high court after he suffered a horrific leg injury in March 1993 whilst playing for Stockport County in a match against Swansea City. The watching Coventry City manager Bobby Gould described John Cornforth's challenge on McCord as "one of the worst tackles I have ever seen".

References

1968 births
Living people
English footballers
Association football midfielders
English Football League players
Derby County F.C. players
Barnsley F.C. players
Stockport County F.C. players
Mansfield Town F.C. players
Notts County F.C. players
Stalybridge Celtic F.C. players
Leek Town F.C. players
Telford United F.C. players
Barrow A.F.C. players
Gainsborough Trinity F.C. players